The 1998 World Junior Championships in Athletics is the 1998 edition of the World Junior Championships in Athletics. It was held in Annecy, France from July 28 to August 2.

Results

Men

1 Ahmed Baday of Morocco originally won the bronze medal in 13:49.86, but he was disqualified after it was discovered he was 24 years old at the time of the Championships.

Women

Medal table

Participation
According to an unofficial count through an unofficial result list, 1156 athletes from 169 countries participated in the event.  This is in agreement with the official numbers as published.

References

External links
Official site (archived)
Official results

 
1998
World Junior Championships in Athletics
World Junior Championships in Athletics
International athletics competitions hosted by France